Idiomarina piscisalsi is a bacterium from the genus of Idiomarina which has been isolated from Pla ra from Thailand.

References

Bacteria described in 2014
Alteromonadales